Eyiah Kyei Baffour is a Ghanaian politician and member of the Seventh Parliament of the Fourth Republic of Ghana representing the Lower West Akim Constituency in the Eastern Region on the ticket of the New Patriotic Party.

References

Ghanaian MPs 2017–2021
1968 births
Living people
New Patriotic Party politicians